Stuart Fraser is a politician based in the City of London Corporation. He was chair of the Policy and Resources Committee there from 2008 until 2012. He became involved as a politician following a successful career as a stockbroker. He is a director of Brewin Dolphin.

Fraser was first elected to the Court of Common Council representing Coleman Street Ward in 1992.

When he became chair of the City of London Policy and Resources Committee, he said that he viewed the 2008 financial crisis a "phoney crisis" and said that he "would still like the City of London to dominate the world." In 2010 he claimed to be probably the most effective lobbyist in Britain.

References

Living people
Year of birth missing (living people)